Separated at birth, usually phrased as a question, is a light-hearted media device for pointing out people who are unrelated but bear a notable facial resemblance, implying that they are twins who were separated soon after being born and presumably adopted by separate families.

The title "Separated at Birth?" was a trademark of Spy Publishing Partners, the publishers of the now defunct Spy magazine, a monthly publication that published satire, humor, and investigative journalism from 1986 to 1998. The magazine would pair two carefully selected photos of two unrelated famous persons and the juxtaposition would highlight their physical similarities to humorous effect.

There were several Separated at Birth? books issued around the same time, with whimsical comparisons such as Mick Jagger vs. Don Knotts as the fictional film character The Incredible Mr. Limpet.

Notes and citations

See also 

 Doppelgänger
 Look-alike
 Sister, Sister
Mysticons 
 Nature versus nurture

Human appearance
English phrases